The Bemm River is a perennial river, located in the East Gippsland region of the Australian state of Victoria.

Course and features
The river descends  over its  course.

The catchment area comprises mainly public land, including Errinundra National Park and the Lind National Park. These areas have a broad range of ecosystems including cool and warm temperate rainforest, ancient wet eucalypt forest, coastal heathland and banksia woodland. The Bemm River catchment area is managed by the East Gippsland Catchment Management Authority.

Etymology
The name of the river is derived from the Aboriginal words binn or birn of the Gunai people, meaning "fish hawk".

See also

 East Gippsland Catchment Management Authority
 List of rivers of Australia

References

External links
 
 
 

East Gippsland catchment
Rivers of Gippsland (region)